Golcheshmeh-ye Bala (also Romanized as Golcheshmeh-ye Bālā; also known as Gol Chashmeh, Golcheshmeh, and Gulchashmeh) is a village in Baqerabad Rural District, in the Central District of Mahallat County, Markazi Province, Iran. At the 2006 census, its population was 179, in 61 families.

References 

Populated places in Mahallat County